Little Rock Creek is a stream in Beltrami County, Minnesota, in the United States. It flows into Red Lake.

Little Rock Creek was named from the many small boulders near its mouth.

See also
List of rivers of Minnesota

References

Rivers of Beltrami County, Minnesota
Rivers of Minnesota